Daniela Rondinelli (born 19 August 1967) is an Italian politician and member of the European Parliament in 2019.

References

1967 births
Living people
MEPs for Italy 2019–2024
21st-century women MEPs for Italy
Five Star Movement MEPs
Together for the Future politicians